Kotili is a village in the Bas-Uélé province of the Democratic Republic of the Congo. It was a station on the defunct Vicicongo line, a railway.

Location

Kotili is in the Bas-Uélé province, Democratic Republic of the Congo, in the west of the Buta Territory.
It is on the RN4 road between Buta to the east and Dulia to the west, and is a few kilometers north of the Rubi River.

Railway

The main axis of the Vicicongo line built by the Société des Chemins de Fer Vicinaux du Congo ran east from ran from Aketi through Komba to Dulia, then through Kotili to Buta.

Notes

Sources

Populated places in Bas-Uélé